Mary Magdalene with Eight Scenes from her Life is a c.1280-1285 tempera and gold on panel painting by the Master of the Magdalen, now in the Galleria dell'Accademia in Florence.

History
Its original provenance is unknown, but it was mentioned as being in the vestibule of the monastery library at Santissima Annunziata in guidebooks by Follini-Rastrelli and Moreni, as part of a group of works within the collection of Francesco Raimondo Adami, Vicar General of the Ordine dei Servi di Maria. When the religious houses were suppressed in 1810 the painting moved to its present home, where it has been exhibited since 1817

Side scenes

Left column
Top to bottom:
Mary Magdalene Anointing Christ's Feet
Noli Me Tangere
Mary Magdalene Borne to Heaven by Angels
Mary Magdalene's Last Communion

Right column
Top to bottom:
Resurrection of Lazarus
Mary Magdalene Preaching
An Angel Feeding Mary Magdalene in the Desert
Funeral of Mary Magdalene

References

Bibliography (in Italian)
G. Bonsanti, La galleria dell'Accademia, Firenze. Guida e catalogo completo, Firenze, 1990.
AA.VV., Galleria dell'Accademia, Giunti, Firenze 1999.  
Franca Falletti, Marcella Anglani, Galleria dell'Accademia. Guida ufficiale, Firenze, Giunti Editore, 1999.  (online)

Paintings in the collection of the Galleria dell'Accademia
1280s paintings
Paintings depicting Mary Magdalene